State Route 41 (SR 41) is a state highway in California, connecting the Central Coast with the San Joaquin Valley and the Sierra Nevada. Its western terminus is at the Cabrillo Highway (SR 1) in Morro Bay, and its eastern terminus is at SR 140 in Yosemite National Park. It has been constructed as an expressway from near SR 198 in Lemoore north to the south part of Fresno, where the Yosemite Freeway begins, passing along the east side of downtown and extending north into Madera County.

Route description
The majority of Route 41 runs as either two-lane rural highway or four-lane divided highway. The only part of SR 41 that turns into a freeway itself is in Fresno County and parts of Madera. The southern end of the highway intersects SR 1 in Morro Bay. Between Morro Bay and Fresno, the highway intersects U.S. Route 101 in Atascadero, proceeds through the Coast Range and intersects SR 46. Actor James Dean died in an accident in 1955 at the intersection of SR 46 in Cholame. Currently, there is a memorial located there. The interchange is now called the James Dean Memorial Junction. Between SR 46 and SR 33, SR 41 ascends the Diablo Range and Cottonwood Pass and briefly travels through Kern County without any intersections in its entirety. After entering Kings County, it reaches SR 33. SR 41 then intersects Interstate 5 south of Kettleman City. A large hazardous waste and municipal solid waste disposal facility operated by Waste Management, Inc. is located 5.6 km (3.5 mi) SSW of Kettleman City on the west side of the highway. Just before reaching the intersection at SR 198 outside of the city of Lemoore, SR 41 becomes a four-lane divided highway until just southeast of Riverdale, where SR 41 reverts to one lane in each direction. The El Adobe de los Robles Rancho built by pioneer Daniel Rhoads can be found north of Lemoore.

Southeast of Caruthers, SR 41 becomes a four-lane divided highway and eventually a freeway approaching the Fresno city limits. The route intersects SR 99 near Jensen Avenue. Complete access is not available between SR 41/SR 99. For example, there is no direct connector between the southbound SR 41 and northbound SR 99; drivers wanting to make this transition must exit at the SR 41/SR 180 interchange, head west on SR 180, and then transition onto SR 99 at the interchange between those two freeways. Likewise, there is no direct connector between the northbound SR 41 and the southbound SR 99. Drivers must exit at Jensen Avenue, head east on Jensen until its junction with SR 99 a half-mile east of SR 41, and then make the southbound transition onto SR 99.

SR 41 continues north into downtown Fresno, then intersects SR 180 at a section of the latter route that links SR 41 to both SR 99 to the west, and to SR 168 to the east. North of Fresno, the route crosses the San Joaquin River, and enters Madera County near Valley Children's Hospital before reverting to a two-lane highway.  further north, SR 41 intersects with SR 145, before entering California's Sierra-Nevada mountain range. SR 41 continues through the towns of Coarsegold and Oakhurst, where it intersects with SR 49.

SR 41 then heads north to the southern entrance to Yosemite National Park. Inside the park, state routes are federally maintained and are not included in the state route logs. Although there is an "End SR 41" sign south of the park's entrance, state routes within the park may still be signed at intersections. The highway continues as Wawona Road north to Wawona and Yosemite West before turning east to pass through Wawona Tunnel. Tunnel View is a viewpoint located just outside the east end of the Wawona Tunnel, and provides the first view of Yosemite Valley. The route then continues into Yosemite Valley where it terminates at SR 140/Southside Drive.

Except between US 101 in Atascadero and SR 46 near Shandon, SR 41 is part of the California Freeway and Expressway System, and north of SR 46 is part of the National Highway System, a network of highways that are considered essential to the country's economy, defense, and mobility by the Federal Highway Administration. Three segmentsfrom SR 1 to US 101, SR 46 to SR 33, and SR 49 at Oakhurst to Yosemite (the Wawona Road)are eligible for inclusion in the State Scenic Highway System, but SR 41 is not officially designated as a scenic highway by the California Department of Transportation. SR 41 is known as the E.G. Lewis Highway from SR 1 to US 101 in San Luis Obispo County, the Dwight David Eisenhower Memorial Freeway from Ventura Avenue in Fresno to Herndon Avenue in Fresno, the Donald DeMers Highway from Jensen Avenue in Fresno to Elkhorn Avenue, the Yosemite Freeway from Elkhorn Avenue to the Fresno-Madera County line, the Southern Yosemite Highway from the Fresno-Madera County line to Yosemite National Park, and the Wawona Road from Fresno to Yosemite National Park.

History

In 1930, the counties of Fresno, Kings, Kern, and San Luis Obispo considered organizing a joint highway district to construct a shortcut connecting Fresno with the Pacific Ocean at Morro Bay. This highway would pass through Kettleman City on its way to the Cholame Lateral (Legislative Route 33) near Cholame or Shandon, and then continue to Morro Bay, where a new harbor was being developed. The entire length from Fresno to Morro Bay, as well as the Wawona Road to Yosemite, was added to the state highway system in 1933 as Route 125, and subsequently improved by the state. In 1934, the state sign route system was established, and Sign Route 41 was designated along Route 125 from Yosemite south and southwest to Cholame and then west through Paso Robles to Cambria via Legislative Route 33. The part of Route 125 southwest of Cholame instead became part of the new U.S. Route 466.

By the 1950s, the short piece of US 466 (Route 125) between Creston and Atascadero had not yet been paved, and so US 466 was moved to the longer but better road via Paso Robles, replacing SR 41 to Paso Robles and overlapping US 101 to Atascadero. As SR 41 had not been signed over the unpaved road west of Paso Robles, it was truncated to Cholame. US 466 was eliminated in the 1964 renumbering, becoming SR 46 east from Paso Robles. However, instead of going south and west to Morro Bay, SR 46 continued west to Cambria, and the road via Creston and Atascadero to Morro Bay (which had since been paved) became part of SR 41.

In the 1980s, the urban stretch of 41 running through Fresno was upgraded to freeway standards, intersecting SR 99 to the south. In the late 1990s and early 2000s, the freeway portion was extended several miles beyond Fresno in both directions.

Also in the late 1990s and early 2000s in Atascadero, the old SR 41 alignment used to cut through downtown by going north on El Camino Real and turning right onto West Mall. Then it continued past the Atascadero Colony Building and crossed the 1921 Atascadero Creek Bridge before turning left onto Capistrano Avenue. It then went under a low clearance railroad crossing and a dangerous narrow bridge crossing the Salinas River before rejoining its existing alignment. Then Caltrans built a bypass of this dangerous route with a long wider bridge crossing the railroad, Sycamore Drive, and the river before joining the original 1950s SR 41. SR 41 is now currently signed on this bypass. Since then, the old bridge was demolished but the railroad undercrossing still remains. There's an old sign on Capistrano Avenue that still marks it as "Hwy 41" and signs on El Camino Real that mark West Mall with covered up "41" shields.

Future
The Kings County Association of Governments has plans to improve the state highways within the county. Developers are interested in building distribution warehouses in Kings County because of its strategic location midway between the Los Angeles and San Francisco Bay areas, but they are currently turned off by the lack of freeway access. For SR 41, the plan is to upgrade it so the highway is a continuous freeway from I-5 north to Fresno County. However, Kings County voters have shown little interest in passing any transportation taxes to fund these projects.

Major intersections

See also

References

External links

 California @ AARoads.com - State Route 41
 Caltrans: Route 41 highway conditions
 California Highways: Route 41

041
041
State Route 041
State Route 041
State Route 041
State Route 041
State Route 041
State Route 041
Yosemite National Park